This is a list of common chemical compounds with chemical formulae and CAS numbers, indexed by formula. This complements alternative listing at list of inorganic compounds.
There is no complete list of chemical compounds since by nature the list would be infinite.

Note: There are elements for which spellings may differ, such as aluminum/aluminium, sulfur/sulphur, and caesium/cesium.

A

B

C
C
C2
C3
C4
C5
H
C7
C8
C9
C10
C15
C20

CCa–Cu

D

E

F

G

H

I

K

L

M

N

O

P

R

S

T

U

V

W

X

Y

Z

External links
Webelements
Landolt Börnstein Organic Index 2004

Chemical compounds
Chemical formulas
Chemical formulas
Lists of chemical compounds
Chemical formulae
Wikipedia glossaries using tables